Diploma is a British-based business supplying specialised technical products and services. It is a constituent of the FTSE 250 Index.

History
The company, which was founded in 1931, was first listed on the London Stock Exchange in 1960, and was a market leader in electronic component distribution, building products and special steels until the late 1980s. The electronic component distribution business (SEI Macro) was sold in 1999, the building products business (Robert Lee) was sold in 2000, and the special steels business (Henry Whitham) was sold in 2001.

It was announced in August 2018, that CEO Richard Ingram will be stepping down after four months in charge, with John Nicholas acting as executive chairman in interim charge.

Operations
Diploma is a distributor, operating in the three sectors of Controls (including specialised wiring), Seals (including seals and gaskets) and Life Sciences (including consumables and instrumentation).

The company has operations in North America, Europe, Australia, New Zealand, New Caledonia, and China.

References

External links
 Official site

Conglomerate companies established in 1931
Companies based in the London Borough of Islington
Companies listed on the London Stock Exchange
Business services companies established in 1931
Manufacturing companies established in 1931
1931 establishments in England